Ken Croswell is an American astronomer and author.  His first degree, from Washington University in St. Louis, mixed science and wider interests, majoring in physics and minoring in English literature.  He also got a PhD in astronomy from Harvard University for studying the Milky Way's halo.

He is primarily known as a writer on astronomy and space topics.  He has written regularly the New Scientist, New York Times and various magazines in the popular science press.  He is also the author of six books on astronomy, including The Alchemy of the Heavens and Planet Quest, and often reports on the radio program the John Batchelor Show. Croswell lives in Berkeley, California.

Bibliography

Books

Essays and reporting

References

External links 
 Ken Croswell's website

American astronomers
Living people
Harvard Graduate School of Arts and Sciences alumni
Scientific American people
Scientists from California
Washington University in St. Louis alumni
Washington University physicists
Year of birth missing (living people)